Vernon Driscoll (11 April 1891 – 19 March 1967) was an Australian cricketer. He played four first-class matches for Tasmania between 1927 and 1932.

See also
 List of Tasmanian representative cricketers

References

External links
 

1891 births
1967 deaths
Australian cricketers
Tasmania cricketers
Cricketers from Tasmania